Hastula cinerea, the grey Atlantic auger,  is a species of sea snail, a marine gastropod mollusc in the family Terebridae, the auger snails.

Description
The length of the shell varies between 16 mm and 68 mm. 
Protoconch is a very dark/black sharp tip, and a horny brown operculum is present.  No periostracum, shell is glossy overall.

Distribution
This shallow-water species occurs in the Atlantic Ocean off Angola, Cape Verde, Senegal and Brazil; in the Caribbean Sea, the Gulf of Mexico and the Lesser Antilles; in the Indian Ocean off Madagascar.

References

 Dautzenberg, Ph. (1929). Contribution à l'étude de la faune de Madagascar: Mollusca marina testacea. Faune des colonies françaises, III(fasc. 4). Société d'Editions géographiques, maritimes et coloniales: Paris. 321–636, plates IV-VII pp. 
 Bouchet P. (1983 ["1982"]) Les Terebridae (Mollusca, Gastropoda) de l'Atlantique oriental. Bollettino Malacologico 18: 185–216.
 Bratcher T. & Cernohorsky W.O. (1987). Living terebras of the world. A monograph of the recent Terebridae of the world. American Malacologists, Melbourne, Florida & Burlington, Massachusetts. 240pp.
 Terryn Y. (2007). Terebridae: A Collectors Guide. Conchbooks & NaturalArt. 59pp + plates.

External links
 Adams, C. B. 1850. Description of supposed new species of marine shells which inhabit Jamaica. Contributions to Conchology, 4: 56-68, 109-123
 Rosenberg, G.; Moretzsohn, F.; García, E. F. (2009). Gastropoda (Mollusca) of the Gulf of Mexico, Pp. 579–699 in: Felder, D.L. and D.K. Camp (eds.), Gulf of Mexico–Origins, Waters, and Biota. Texas A&M Press, College Station, Texas
 Fedosov, A. E.; Malcolm, G.; Terryn, Y.; Gorson, J.; Modica, M. V.; Holford, M.; Puillandre, N. (2020). Phylogenetic classification of the family Terebridae (Neogastropoda: Conoidea). Journal of Molluscan Studies
 

Terebridae
Gastropods described in 1778
Molluscs of the Atlantic Ocean
Molluscs of the Indian Ocean